Gisela Dulko and Flavia Pennetta were the defending champions, but Pennetta chose not to compete.
Dulko partnered with Zheng Jie, but lost in the quarterfinals to Chan Yung-jan and Monica Niculescu.

Chuang Chia-jung and Květa Peschke won in the final, 3–6, 6–3, 10–7, against Chan and Niculescu.

Seeds

  Hsieh Su-wei /  Peng Shuai (semifinals)
  Sania Mirza /  Virginia Ruano Pascual (quarterfinals)
  Gisela Dulko /  Zheng Jie (quarterfinals)
  Alla Kudryavtseva /  Ekaterina Makarova (first round)

Draw

External links
Main Draw Doubles

Doubles
Hobart International – Doubles